Songs One Through Six (2006) is the latest release from Chris Mason. It is his third release, following two previous full-length studio albums, the most recent being Crowded Spaces (2003).

Recorded at The Velvet Eagle, in Nashville, TN. Mastered at Final Stage Mastering, by Al Willis. Art and design by Jordan Brooke Hamlin.

Track listing
All songs written by Chris Mason.

  "Waiting" – 3:50
  "Slow Me Down" – 4:28
  "Second Chance" – 3:37
  "Down Here" – 4:12
  "Reaching Out" – 4:09
  "Precious Lord Thy Mercy Come" – 4:45

Credits
Chris Mason – vocals, acoustic guitar, harmonica, electric guitar
Andrew Osenga – electric guitar, piano, bass guitar, mandolin guitar, baritone, background vocals
Cason Cooley – keyboard, mandolin guitar, Rhodes piano, electric guitar, bass guitar, percussion, piano, counter
Paul Eckberg – drums

Chris Mason (musician) albums
2006 EPs